Nawal Hijazi is a Lebanese voice actress.

Filmography

Dubbing roles 
Around the World with Willy Fog
Arrow Emblem: Hawk of the Grand Prix - Rie Katori
Astroganger
Clémentine
Hello! Sandybell - Sandybell
Inspector Gadget - Penny
Lightspeed Electroid Albegas
Manga Aesop Monogatari
Manga Sarutobi Sasuke - Yuki
Moomin - Moominmamma (Lebanese dub)
My Pet Monster
Nobody's Boy: Remi - Arthur Milligan, Lise Acquin, Benjamin Acquin (Lebanese dub)
Pole Position
Rainbow Brite
Serendipity the Pink Dragon
Sport Billy - Lilly
The Adventures of Pepero - Chuchu, Narrator (Lebanese dub)
The Adventures of Teddy Ruxpin
The Care Bears (Lebanese dub)
The Littles
The Many Dream Journeys of Meme
Time Travel Tondekeman - Yumi
Tom Clancy's The Division
Treasure Island - Jim's mother (first voice), Lily (Lebanese dub)
UFO Robot Grendizer - Hikaru Makiba (Lebanese dub)

References

External links 

Nawal Hijazi at ElCinema

Living people
Lebanese voice actresses
Place of birth missing (living people)
Year of birth missing (living people)